Pterocarpus marsupium, also known as Malabar kino, Indian kino, Vijayasar, or Venkai is a medium to large, deciduous tree that can grow up to  tall. It is native to India (where it occurs in parts of the Western Ghats in the Karnataka-Kerala region and in the forests of Central India), Nepal, and Sri Lanka.

References

External links

marsupium
Flora of the Indian subcontinent